Manuripi Airport  is an airstrip serving the settlement of Manuripi on the Manuripi River in the Pando Department of Bolivia.

See also

Transport in Bolivia
List of airports in Bolivia

References

External links 
OurAirports - Manuripi
FallingRain - Manuripi Airport
Bing Maps - Manuripi

Airports in Pando Department